Earnest Albert Hooton (November 20, 1887 – May 3, 1954) was an American physical anthropologist known for his work on racial classification and his popular writings such as the book Up From The Ape. Hooton sat on the Committee on the Negro, a group that "focused on the anatomy of blacks and reflected the racism of the time."

Biography

Earnest Albert Hooton was born in Clemansville, Wisconsin, the third child and only son of an English-born Methodist minister married to a Canadian-born woman of Scotch-Irish ancestry. He was educated at Lawrence University in Appleton, Wisconsin. After earning his BA there in 1907, he won a Rhodes Scholarship to Oxford University, which he deferred in order to continue his studies in the United States. He pursued graduate studies in Classics at the University of Wisconsin–Madison, where he received an MA in 1908 and a Ph.D. in 1911 on "The Pre-Hellenistic Stage of the Evolution of the Literary Art at Rome", and then continued on to England. He applied for and was awarded a Rhodes scholarship, electing to study at Oxford. There he assisted in the excavation of Viking boat burials. Studying with R.R. Marett, he received a diploma in 1912 and with Marett’s strong support he secured a teaching position at Harvard for next four decades. During this time, he was also Curator of Somatology at the nearby Peabody Museum of Archaeology and Ethnology.

With the beginning of the First World War, he was disqualified from military service due to the nearsightedness, but nonetheless he volunteered for training at the Civilian Military Training Center at Plattsburgh, New York, and became a passable rifleman at 100 yards. He also helped revise recruitment standards because too large a number of American immigrants were too short to qualify for service at the time.

During the 1930s, between the two World Wars, his data collections helped U.S. Army make better-fitting military equipment, such as uniforms, tank helmets, gas masks, and aircraft seats, long before Le Gros Clark coined ergonomics for civilian (commercial) use.

After World War II, he surveyed commuters in Boston’s North Station to help make more comfortable train seats, as described in his book A Survey of Seating.

He was one of the founding members of the American Association of Physical Anthropologists, serving as president from 1936 to 1938 and associate editor of the American Journal of Physical Anthropology from 1928 to 1942, working closely with Aleš Hrdlička.

Hooton was an advanced primatologist for his time. If the great Latin playwright Terence said, "Homo sum: humani nihil a me alienum puto" ("I am a man; nothing about men is alien to me"), Hooton, following and correcting him, used to say: "Primas sum: primatum nihil a me alienum puto" ("I am a primate; nothing about primates is alien to me").

Hooton was also a public figure well known for popular volumes with titles like Up From the Ape (1931), Apes, Men, and Morons (1937), and Young Man, You are Normal (1945). He was also a gifted cartoonist and wit, and, like his contemporaries Ogden Nash and James Thurber, he published occasional poems and drawings that were eventually collected and published.

After reaching the official retirement age (65), he was invited to teach courses that had decreased in enrollment and died unexpectedly of a vascular accident while teaching.

He was survived by his wife Mary Camp Hooton, whom he married in 1913, by two sons (Newton and Jay), one daughter (Emma Hooton Robbins), and two grandchildren.

Race

Hooton used comparative anatomy to divide humanity up into races — in Hooton's case, this involved describing the morphological characteristics of different "primary races" and the various "subtypes". In 1926, the American Association of Physical Anthropology and the National Research Council organized a Committee on the Negro, which focused on the anatomy of blacks. Among those appointed to the Committee on the Negro were Hrdlička, Earnest Hooton and eugenist Charles Davenport. In 1927, the committee endorsed a comparison of African babies with young apes. Ten years later, the group published findings in the American Journal of Physical Anthropology to "prove that the negro race is phylogenetically a closer approach to primitive man than the white race." Hooton played a key part in establishing the racial stereotypes about black athleticism and black criminality of his day in terms of an anthropological framework. Hooton was one of the first to attempt to develop mathematically rigorous criteria for race typology.

At the same time, Hooton maintained that no scientific basis existed correlating mentality with racial variation. "...Each racial type runs the gamut from idiots and criminals to geniuses and statesmen. No type produces a majority of individuals from either end of the scale. While there may be specific racial abilities and disabilities, these have not yet been demonstrated. There are no racial monopolies either of human virtues or of vices." While advocating eugenic sterilizations of those deemed "insane, diseased, and criminalistic", he emphasized there was no justification to correlate such "degeneracy", as he termed it, with race. Anthropologist Pat Shipman presents Hooton's work as representing a transition in anthropology away from its 19th-century stereotypes about race and its fixation over cranial measurements. In that context, she writes, Hooton maintained an "oversimplistic mode of thinking about human types and variability" while at the same time he moved to eliminate unfounded racial biases and pseudoscience. His remarks in a 1936 conference dealing with immigration, for example, included a ten-point summary of the current scientific consensus about race which, in retrospect, parallel the points raised ten years later in UNESCO's landmark The Race Question.

The "Hooton Plan"

In 1943, Hooton had an article entitled "Breed War Strain Out of Germans" published in the New York newspaper PM. In the article he proposed four measures with an objective to "destroy German nationalism and aggressive ideology while retaining and perpetuating desirable German biological and sociological capacities". Hooton wrote these measures as follows:

Hooton on African Americans (1930-1940)

In 1932, Hooton wrote an article titled "Is the Negro Inferior". It was published by the Crisis magazine. He brought up the discussion of racial differences and claimed that it existed in the United States. Hooton first defined race as a matter of inheritance. As we grow up we observe that a group of people with different physical appearances also have different manners or culture than ourselves. The differences between races have made the basis of racial differences. The conflict has begun when the natives use their behaviors as the standard of living. As Hooton said, "We are then likely to infer that the people who have produced [a distinct material culture] belong to a race inferior to ours." We first assumed the native measure of culture is the standard and all the outcasts were inferior. Then, we developed a set of thinking that a culture is an accurate measurement of the individual intelligence. That was where racial segregation or discrimination begins.

Hooton also brought out the controversy of the intelligence test. Hooton believed we should be aware of the bias existing in those tests. Different races have different cultural backgrounds; he thought that maybe it was the Whites who cannot devise intelligent tests that are fairly applicable.

Hooton on the Celtic Race in Ireland
Hooton led the examinations of skulls found in Ireland by the "Harvard Archaeological Mission to Ireland" (1932–36), with Clarence Wesley Dupertuis and Helen Lucerne Dawson, that was sponsored by the Irish Free State government, and conveniently found many of the right "types", if not exactly an identifiably-distinct "race". The Irish Free State was set up in 1922 in line with the beliefs of Irish nationalism, including the assumption that the island-dwelling Irish must be the purest of the Celtic-speaking races. Hooton's work was not quoted after 1945.

Quotations

 "The fitness of any man to live in any community depends on his ability to fall in with its ways. If he is very unadaptable, he is a criminal. He is not blond or dark. He is not tall or short. He is not German or Irish. He is a man who has been woven into American social fabric, who thinks as his fellow citizens do about accepted institutions and who conduct himself as they do. By his deeds is he to be judged: not by his looks or his geographic origin." —(New York Times, 1936).
 "There is no anthropological ground whatever for selecting any so-called racial groups, or any ethnic or national group, or any linguistic or religious group, for preferment of condemnation. Our real purpose should be to segregate and eliminate the unfit, worthless, degenerate and anti-social portion of each racial and ethnic strain in our population, so that we may utilize the substantial merits of the sound majority, and the special and diversified gifts of its superior members." —(New York Times, 1936).
 "It is not until genetics is so far advanced that we can apply its findings to the human race that such measurements as those made by me acquire real scientific Value. There is no superior or pure races in the world." —(New York Times, 1934).

Criticism

E.B. Reuter, a sociologist and contemporary of Hooton, criticized Hooton for using circular logic when he ascribed the physical traits of criminals to cause criminality.

Footnotes

Works
Africana. I-5 co-editor (1917) 'recording the habits of foul or barbarous savages' pub. Peabody Museum. From Internet Archive.

Further reading

 
 
 Shapiro, H. 1954. Earnest Albert Hooton, 1887-1954 (obituary) in American Anthropologist 56(6): 1081-1084
 
 Melear, K.B. The Criminological Theory of Earnest A. Hooton. 'Summer 1998'. Florida State University: Criminology
 Redman, Samuel J. Bone Rooms: From Scientific Racism to Human Prehistory in Museums. Cambridge: Harvard University Press. 2016.

External links
 The Earnest Albert Hooton Prize — American Association of Physical Anthropologists
The page includes a selected list of Hooton's publications.
 National Academy of Sciences Biographical Memoir
 "Papers of Earnest A. Hooton, 1926-1954 (inclusive): A Finding Aid," Harvard University Library: Peabody Museum Archives, 1995 and 2007. Call No: 995-1. — 28 document boxes.

1887 births
1954 deaths
People from Oshkosh, Wisconsin
Writers from Wisconsin
Lawrence University alumni
University of Wisconsin–Madison College of Letters and Science alumni
Harvard University faculty
American Rhodes Scholars
20th-century American anthropologists